This is the discography of rapper Mike Jones.

Albums

Studio albums

EPs

Collaborative albums

Mixtapes

Singles

As lead artist

As featured artist

Promotional singles

Other charted songs

Guest appearances

Video cameos
 "Fresh Azimiz"  (by Bow Wow) 
 "D-Girl (DopeGirl)"  (by Brooke Valentine featuring Pimp C) 
 "Knockin' Doorz Down"  (by Pimp C featuring P.O.P. and Lil Keke) 
 "The Game Belongs to Me"  (by UGK) 
 "Laffy Taffy"  (by D4L) 
 Gangsta Party"  (by Yo Gotti)

Notes

References

Hip hop discographies
Discographies of American artists